Thomas A. Gold was an English rally driver.

Career
He has finished on the podium a couple of times in the RAC Rally; third in 1958 driving a Standard Pennant and second in 1959 driving an Austin Healey Sprite. Driving the same car, he also finished eighth on the 13th Tulip Rally in 1961.

References

External links
 eWRC

English rally drivers
1932 births
2014 deaths